Siemaszko is a Polish surname of East Slavic origin, the Polish transliteration of the surname Semashko. Notable people with the surname include:

Artur Siemaszko, Polish footballer
Casey Siemaszko, American actor
Ewa Siemaszko, Polish writer, publicist and lecturer
Nina Siemaszko, American actress
Rafał Siemaszko, Polish footballer
Władysław Siemaszko,  Polish publicist and lawyer, former member of the Polish resistance Armia Krajowa

See also

Polish-language surnames
pl:Siemaszko